Jan-Armin Eichhorn (born 8 May 1981 in Sonneberg) is a German luger who has competed since 1999. He won the bronze medal in the men's singles event at the 2007 FIL World Luge Championships in Igls, Austria.

Eichhorn won a gold medal in the mixed team event at the 2004 FIL European Luge Championships in Oberhof, Germany. His best individual finish was fourth in the men's singles event at those same games.

He also finished sixth in the men's singles at the 2006 Winter Olympics in Turin.

References
FIL-Luge profile

External links 
 
 
 

1981 births
Living people
German male lugers
Olympic lugers of Germany
Lugers at the 2006 Winter Olympics
People from Sonneberg
Sportspeople from Thuringia
21st-century German people